Wangjia Township (Mandarin: 王家乡) is a township in Zêkog County, Huangnan Tibetan Autonomous Prefecture, Qinghai, China. In 2010, Wangjia Township had a total population of 4,371: 2,186 males and 2,185 females: 1,399 aged under 14, 2,740 aged between 15 and 65 and 232 aged over 65.

References 

Township-level divisions of Qinghai
Huangnan Tibetan Autonomous Prefecture